Sociedad Deportiva Teucro is a handball team based in Pontevedra, Galicia, in Spain. SD Teucro currently plays (2015–16 season) in Liga ASOBAL.

Season by season

15 seasons in Liga ASOBAL

Current squad

Notable players
 David Davis
 José Javier Hombrados
 Xavier Pascual Fuertes
 Draško Mrvaljević
 Borko Ristovski
 Dejan Perić
 Dalibor Doder

Stadium information
Name: - Pavillón Municipal
City: - Pontevedra
Capacity: - 3,500
Address: - Rúa J.M. Pintos s/n

External links
Official website

Spanish handball clubs
Sports teams in Galicia (Spain)
Handball clubs established in 1945
1945 establishments in Spain
Pontevedra